Australothis hackeri is a species of moth of the family Noctuidae. It is only known from northern Sumatra.

Heliothinae